Brigitte Klinkert is a French politician who served as Minister Delegate in charge of Integration attached to the Minister of Labour, Employment and Integration in the government of Prime Minister Jean Castex from 2020 to 2022.

Early life and education
Brigitte Anne Francine Klinkert was born on 22 July 1956 in Colmar, Alsace, France. Her grandfather, Joseph Rey, had been the mayor of Colmar from 1947 to 1977. After secondary school in a private catholic institution, she studied law (1976) before graduating from the Metz Regional Institute of Administration in 1978.

Political career
Klinkert started her career as municipal councilor of Colmar in 1983, a position she will keep until 2020.  She joined the departmental council of Haut-Rhin in 1994. She became President of the Haut-Rhin department in 2017,  the first woman elected in that position, she left the position to enter the Castex government in July 2020, as Minister delegate for Integration under the direction of Minister of Labour, Elisabeth Borne.

After being a member of UDF from 1998 to 2002, Klinkert joined UMP then, after the party changed its named, LR in 2015 before leaving in 2019.

She was elected in Haut-Rhin's 1st constituency at the 2022 French legislative election.

Recognition
In 2021 Klinkert received the Grand Cross of Merit of the Federal Republic of Germany.

See also
 Castex Government

References

Sources
 Biographie Brigitte Klinkert (in French)
 Resumé Brigitte Klinkert (in French)
 

1956 births
Living people
Women government ministers of France
20th-century French women politicians
21st-century French women politicians
Chevaliers of the Légion d'honneur
Officers of the Ordre national du Mérite
Union for French Democracy politicians
Union for a Popular Movement politicians
The Republicans (France) politicians
Departmental councillors (France)
Presidents of French departments
Regional councillors of Grand Est

Women members of the National Assembly (France)
Deputies of the 16th National Assembly of the French Fifth Republic